Emile Plantamour or Émile Plantamour, (14 May 1815 - 7 September 1882) was a Swiss astronomer.

Biography
He was the son of François-Théodore, Hospital director, and of Louise Saladin. He was born in Geneva.

He studied astronomy with Jean-Alfred Gautier and worked with François Arago in Paris, Alexander von Humboldt and Johann Franz Encke in Berlin, Friedrich Wilhelm Bessel at the University of Königsberg and Carl Friedrich Gauss at the University of Göttingen.

He was the fourth director of the Observatory of Geneva from 1839 to 1882 (43 years) and honorary professor at the Academy of Geneva; then professor at the University of Geneva when it was established in 1873. He was three times rector of the Academy.

Under his direction, the Observatory of Geneva constructed a structure for magnetic observations, an extension of the main building and a new room for an equatorial mount.

His scientific works involved astronomy, meteorology, chronometry, magnetism, geodesy and gravimetry.

He died in Geneva in 1882.

Works

Bibliography
 R. Wolf: Todes-Anzeige. Astronomische Nachrichten, Bd. 103 (1882), S. 161.
 Emile Plantamour. Monthly Notices of the Royal Astronomical Society, Vol. 43 (1883), p. 184.
 Emile Plantamour. Proceedings of the American Academy of Arts and Sciences, Vol. 18 (May, 1882 – May, 1883), pp. 461–463.

See also 

 Carlos Ibáñez e Ibáñez de Ibero – president of the International Geodetic Association

References

External links
 
 Query Results from the ADS Database - E. Plantamour in Astrophysics Data System

1815 births
1882 deaths
Scientists from Geneva
19th-century Swiss astronomers
University of Königsberg alumni
University of Göttingen alumni
Academic staff of the University of Geneva